Ademar Jordan (fl. 1198–1212) was a knight and troubadour from Saint-Antonin in the Rouergue. He was possibly a vassal of Raimon Jordan.

Ademar apparently participated in the war against the Albigensian Crusade, for he was captured by Simon de Montfort on 6 May 1212 and is not heard from again. On the occasion of his capture he composed a sirventes in imitation of Bertran de Born, .

Ademar may also have participated in one of the Crusades (possibly the Fourth or the Reconquista).

Notes

Sources
Brunel, Clovis (1926). "Les troubadours Ademar Jordan et Uc Brunenc," Romania, 52, p. 506.
Jeanroy, Alfred (1934). La poésie lyrique des troubadours. Toulouse: Privat.
Schulze-Busacker, Elisabeth (1987). "French Conceptions of Foreigners and Foreign Languages in the Twelfth and Thirteenth Centuries," Romance Philology, 41:1 (Aug.) pp. 24–47.

External links
Complete works, edited by Saverio Guida (2003)

12th-century French troubadours
People of the Albigensian Crusade
12th-century births
13th-century deaths
French male poets